Maurice Bourgue (born 6 November 1939) is a French oboist, composer, and conductor.

Biography 
Maurice Bourgue studied at the Conservatoire de Paris in the oboe class of Étienne Baudo and chamber music of Fernand Oubradous. He won a First Prize for oboe in 1958 and a First Prize for chamber music in 1959. He then won first prizes in the following international competitions: Geneva (1963), Birmingham (1965), Munich (1967), Prague Spring International Music Festival (1968), Budapest (1970).

Bourgue was called in 1967 by Charles Munch at the Orchestre de Paris, where he remained solo oboe until 1979.

In parallel, he performed as a soloist, under the direction of prestigious conductors such as Claudio Abbado, Daniel Barenboim, Riccardo Chailly, John Eliot Gardiner, and undertook conducting activities in France and abroad.

Since 1972, he has devoted an important part of his activities to chamber music within the Octuor à vent, which bears his name and of which he is the founder, composed of musicians of the Orchestre de Paris. He would record several records with this band.

As music director of the Sándor-Végh-Institute for Chamber Music, he has a continuous pedagogical activity, both in the conservatories of Paris and Geneva, as well as during masterclasses he animates in Budapest, London, Lausanne, Moscow, Oslo, Jerusalem, and Kyoto.

The creator of works by Berio and Dutilleux (Les Citations, 1991), Bourgue has made a large number of records, many of which have won awards.

References

External links 
 La clef des sons interview with Maurice Bourgue
 
 Maurice Bourgue on La Belle saison
 , Saint-Saëns: Oboe Sonata in D major, Maurice Bourgue (oboe),  (piano)

French classical oboists
Male oboists
French male conductors (music)
French music educators
Conservatoire de Paris alumni
Honorary Members of the Royal Academy of Music
Musicians from Avignon
1939 births
Living people
21st-century French conductors (music)
21st-century French male musicians